Corde Oblique are one of the main ethereal progressive neofolk bands from Italy. They are the solo project of Riccardo Prencipe (composer, art historian) with vocal contributions from numerous female singers and actresses. After seven albums the project began to change its skin and proposed "FolkGaze" sounds, a cross between folk and shoegazer.

Graduated in classical guitar from the Conservatory of Naples San Pietro a Majella, since 2000 Prencipe has released eight albums, distributed in Europe and worldwide by record companies in different countries (Russia, China, Germany, France and Portugal), all excellently reviewed by critics. The original pieces proposed by the ensemble speak of the history of Italian art and of a "wild and talented" South.

History 
Prencipe started in 1999 with his first neomedieval gothic band, LUPERCALIA. They released the first album Soehrimnir with the English label World Serpent distribution (Death in June, Current 93, Antony and the Johnsons, Nurse with Wound) and the second album Florilegium with the Portuguese label Equilibrium Music. In 2005 Riccardo started his idea of the "Workshop of sound", an open team with many artists to collaborate with.

Concerts
Corde Oblique performed in festivals in Italy, China, France, Germany, Belgium, Holland and Albania, sharing the stage with bands like Bauhaus, Anathema, Opeth, Coph Nia, Moonspell, Ataraxia, Persephone, Spiritual Front, QNTAL, Kirlian Camera, and Of the Wand and the moon. 

Places and festivals where they performed since 2005 include Auditorium Parco della Musica (Rome), La Loco (Paris), Gotischer Saal (Berlin), Casa del Jazz (Rome), Archeological Museum (Naples), Schauspielhaus (Leipzig), Culture Centre (Shanghai), La Locomotive (Bologna), Museo Madre (Napol), Tanzbrunnen Theatre (Koeln), Auditorium del Museo di Capodimonte (Naples), Museum Centrale Montemartini (Rome), Theatre Mediterraneo per il Comicon festival (Naples), Stazione Birra (Rome), Giffoni Film Festival (Giffoni), Qube (Rome), Cultural Centre of Huy (Belgio), Casina Vanvitelliana (Bacoli), Teatro centrale di Valona (Albania), Villa Pignatelli (Naples), Oratorio di San Quirino (Parma), Villa Fondi (Piano di Sorrento), Arco di Traiano (Ancona), Università degli Studi (Florence), Casa della Musica (Naples), Giardini Estensi (Modena), and Nanshan recreation and sports theater (Shenzhen, China).

Collaborations with artists and photographers

The band performed at the Comicon Festival with the painter Milo Manara, for the presentation of his book on Caravaggio.

The cover picture and all pictures of the album florilegium are photos by the German photographer Achim Bednorz.

The cover of the album Respiri is a photo by the Japanese photographer Kenro Izu.

The cover of the album I Maestri del Colore is a photo from one of the main Italian photographers, Franco Fontana.

China tour 
In December 2015, Corde Oblique were the first independent band to be invited for a tour of nine concerts in China.

in April 2018 the band performed in China again. They were part of the Nanshan Pop Festival 2018. Their show was at the big stage of the Nanshan recreation and sports theater, in the city of Shenzhen, near Hong Kong.

History of art 

The group's music has a deep connection with the history of art. As an art historian, Riccardo Prencipe (Ph.D) worked for the critic texts for the exhibition in the National Museum of Capodimonte about the painting of a lute player by Jan Vermeer, and held a few lectures about ancient musical instruments through paintings, frescoes and statues (middle age and ancient Rome). He is also an art history teacher at a high school.

List of guests and contributions
In many years Prencipe wrote music and lyrics for many voices and musicians. Here a list of some musicians featured on Corde Oblique's albums:

Caterina Pontrandolfo - vocals on all albums
Maddalena Crippa - spoken vocals on "La Casa del Ponte"
Miro Sassolini ex Diaframma - vocals on "Il Terzo Suono"
Andrea Chimenti - vocals on Per la Strade Ripetute
Duncan Patterson (Anathema) - mandolin on A Hail of Bitter Almonds
Walter Maioli (Synaulia) - flutes on A Hail of Bitter Almonds and I Maestri del Colore
Donatello Pisanello (Officina Zoé) - accordion on A Hail of Bitter Almonds
Floriana Cangiano - vocals on all except Respiri and I Maestri del Colore
Simone Salvatori (Spiritual Front) - vocals on Volontà d'arte
Sergio Panarella (Ashram) - vocals on Volontà d'arte
Spyros Giasafakis (Daemonia Nymphe) - vocals on A Hail of Bitter Almonds and Per la Strade Ripetute
Luigi Rubino (Ashram) - piano on all albums
Claudia Florio - vocals on Volontà d'arte
Catarina Raposo - vocals on Respiri and Volontà d'Arte'''
Denitza Seraphim (Irfan) - vocals on I Maestri del ColoreQuartetto Savinio - appearance on I Maestri del ColoreGiuseppe Frana (Micrologus) - vocals on I Maestri del ColoreRita Saviano - live vocals
Edo Notarloberti (Argine, Ashram) - violin on all albums
Annalisa Madonna - live vocals
Umberto Lepore - live bass
Alessio Sica - live drums

Discography

Studio albumsRespiri (ARK Records/Masterpiece, 2005)Volontà d'arte (Prikosnovenie/Audioglobe, 2007)The Stones of Naples (Prikosnovenie/Audioglobe, 2009)A Hail of Bitter Almonds (Prikosnovenie/Audioglobe, 2011)Per la Strade Ripetute (Prikosnovenie, The Stones of Naples/Audioglobe, 2013)I Maestri del Colore (Infinite fog, Audioglobe, 2016)Back through the liquid mirror - live in the studio (Dark Vinyl, Audioglobe, 2018); Asian edition (CD/DVD Dying art productions 2018)The Moon is a dry bone (Dark Vinyl, Audioglobe, 2020)

 Vinyl Mille anni che sto qui (7", Caustic Records, 2017)

 Digital albums Richiami a Mezzo Mare (2013)Itri (2015)I Maestri del Colore, Vol. 2'' (2016)

References

External links
 
 https://cordeoblique.bandcamp.com/

Italian musical groups
Italian dark wave musical groups
Prikosnovénie artists